Justin Oborn is a British musician, singer, and songwriter. He is the lead vocalist, guitarist and lyricist of Electric Wizard, an English doom metal band from Dorset, which Oborn co-founded in 1993. Prior to forming Electric Wizard, he was a member of doom metal band Lord of Putrefaction, which changed its name to Thy Grief Eternal and then to Eternal.

Career 
During 1988, Oborn formed Lord of Putrefaction. They recorded two demos, before changing their name to Thy Grief Eternal and recording the On Blackened Wings demo. The band then became known simply as Eternal and recorded the Lucifer's Children demo, before disbanding. In 1993, Oborn formed Electric Wizard. He has been the band's frontman since that time. They have released nine albums since 1995.

In early 2003, Tim Bagshaw and Mark Greening left the band, making Oborn the only founding member remaining. Later in that year, Oborn gathered a new line-up for the band, which included his wife, Liz Buckingham, as second guitarist. She has remained part of the band ever since, with her and Oborn both handling guitar duties on Electric Wizard's more recent releases.

Personal life 
Oborn is married to Liz Buckingham, his bandmate of Electric Wizard who joined the group in 2003.

Discography

 1989 – Necromantic demo
 1991 – Wings Over a Black Funeral demo
 1992 – On Blackened Wings demo
 1993 – Lucifer's Children demo
 The above were later included on the compilation Pre-Electric Wizard 1989–1994
 1995 – Electric Wizard
 1996 – Demon Lung
 1997 – Come My Fanatics...
 1997 – Chrono.Naut
 1998 – Supercoven
 2000 – Dopethrone
 2002 – Let Us Prey
 2004 – We Live
 2007 – Witchcult Today
 2008 – The House on the Borderland
 2008 – The Processean
 2010 – Black Masses
 2014 – Time to Die
 2017 – Wizard Bloody Wizard

References

External links
 Electric Wizard biography at Rise Above Records
 Electric Wizard at MySpace
 Electric Wizard  at AllMusic
 Jus Oborn interview (10/2000)
 Jus Oborn interview (09/2004)
 Jus Oborn interview (02/2006)
 Jus Oborn interview (01/2008)
 Jus Oborn interview (04/2008)
 Jus Oborn video interview 2014

Living people
English heavy metal singers
English heavy metal guitarists
Musicians from Dorset
Lead guitarists
1971 births
21st-century English singers
21st-century British guitarists